Bay Settlement is an unincorporated community located in the town of Scott, Brown County, Wisconsin, United States.

History
Bay Settlement is one of the oldest settlements in Wisconsin, as only Green Bay, De Pere, and Prairie du Chien are older. The settlement had a population of eight people in 1830. The community is home to Holy Cross Church, one of the oldest Catholic congregations in the county, which succeeded a mission established at Bay Settlement in 1834. In 1868, a post office opened in Bay Settlement.

References

Unincorporated communities in Brown County, Wisconsin
Unincorporated communities in Wisconsin
Green Bay metropolitan area